Friedrich Plaschke (7 January 1875 – 4 February 1952) was a Czech operatic bass-baritone. From 1900 to 1937 he was a member of the Dresden Hofoper. He also appeared as a guest artist with companies in the United States, the Bayreuth Festival, and at the Royal Opera House in London.

At the Dresden Opera, he appeared in five Richard Strauss premieres: Feuersnot, Salome, Die ägyptische Helena, Die schweigsame Frau, and Arabella. He was married from 1911 to the soprano, Eva von der Osten, who in that year created the role of Octavian in Strauss's Der Rosenkavalier. [Details from Kutsch and Riemens Großes Sängerlexikon.]

1875 births
1952 deaths
Czech opera singers
Operatic bass-baritones
Czech baritones
Austro-Hungarian emigrants to Germany